Matej Loduha (born 28 May 1993) is a Slovak professional footballer who currently plays for 2. liga club MŠK Púchov.

Club career

ŠKF iClinic Sereď
Loduha made his Fortuna Liga debut for iClnic Sereď against Ružomberok on 21 July 2018.

References

External links
 
 
 Futbalnet profile 

1993 births
Living people
Slovak footballers
Place of birth missing (living people)
Association football defenders
FK Dubnica players
MŠK Púchov players
ŠKF Sereď players
Slovak Super Liga players
2. Liga (Slovakia) players